Christian Junior Schoissengeyr Acosta (born 18 October 1994) is a Dominican professional footballer who plays for the Dominican Republic national team.

Club career
On 9 May 2018, Schoissengeyr won the 2017–18 Austrian Cup with Sturm Graz, defeating Red Bull Salzburg 1–0 after extra time.

On 15 June 2022, he signed a one-year contract with Slovenian PrvaLiga side Domžale.

International career
Schoissengeyr was born in the Dominican Republic to an Austrian father and a Dominican mother and moved to Austria at the age of 3. He represented Austria at the under-17 and under-21 levels.

He received his first senior call up for the Dominican Republic in late October 2017 for two friendlies against Nicaragua the next month.

Honours
Sturm Graz
Austrian Cup: 2017–18

References

External links
 SK Sturm Profile

 

1994 births
Living people
People from La Vega Province
Dominican Republic footballers
Association football central defenders
Dominican Republic international footballers
Dominican Republic people of Austrian descent
People with acquired Austrian citizenship
Austrian footballers
SK Rapid Wien players
SK Sturm Graz players
FK Austria Wien players
NK Domžale players
Austrian Regionalliga players
Austrian Football Bundesliga players
2. Liga (Austria) players
Slovenian PrvaLiga players
Austria youth international footballers
Austria under-21 international footballers
Austrian people of Dominican Republic descent
Sportspeople of Dominican Republic descent
Dominican Republic expatriate footballers
Expatriate footballers in Slovenia